The 1959 Junior Springboks tour in Argentina was a series of rugby union matches played in Argentina, in Buenos Aires and Rosario in 1959.

It was the second tour of the second level South African team, the Junior Springboks in Argentina after the tour 1932.

Match results

Match details 

 C.A.San Isidro: J.Lassalle; M.Castex, E.Olivera, J.Lavayen, H.Broggi; M.Molina Berro, E.González del Solar; G.Wessek, F.Varela, G.Montes de Oca; A.Monticelli, L.Varela; M.Iraola (capt.), A.Iraola, F.Berro.
Junior Springboks: C.Meyer; J.Engelbrecht; C.Holtzhausen, M.Bridger, O.Taylor; S.Wentzel, M.Smith; D.Hopwood, H.Meyer, W.van Rensburg; P.Allen (capt.), P.Van Zyl; D.Holton, J.Wessels, C.Edwards. 

 Buenos Aires Cricket & Rugby Club: R.Raimundez (capt.); E.Macadam, A.Macadam, I.Mac Lennan, C.Raimundez; C.Conteponi, R.Brown, S.Hogg, M.Azpiroz, R.Macadam; R.Hogg, J.Gerlach; R.Rumboll, H.Vidou, J.Wall.
Junior Springboks: C.Meyer; J.Engelbrecht, R.Twigge, G.Bridger, J.Gainsford; D.Stewart, F.Gericke; J.Nel, D.Hopwood, J.Bezuidenbout; F.De Jager, P.Állen (capt.); S.Kuhn, J.Wessels, D.Putter. 

Olivos R.C.: H.Rosenblat; R.Faldutti, R.Gil, L.Brisigheli, H.Houssay; A.Salinas, E.Holmgreen; A.Moreno, R.Scalabrini Ortiz, R.Cseh; C.Bronsted, M.Bertolini; C.Bello, H.Lambruschini, A.Pascual. 
Junior Springboks: G.Wentzel; R.Twigge, F.Roux, C.Holzhausen, O.Taylor; D.Stewart M.Smith; J.Nel, H.Meyer, W.van Rensburg; P.Van Zyl, F.de Jager; S.Kuhn, C.Edwards, D.Holton. 

 C.U.B.A.:  C.Aldao; R.Elicagaray, J.Peters, C.Blaksley, P.Peralta Ramos; H.Videla, V.Mayo; C.Álvarez, R.Limpenny; J.Saravia; W.Bunge, J.Bortagaray (capt.); E.Gaviña, J.Etchepareborda, F.Álvarez. Junior Springboks: C.Meyer; J.Engelbrecht, J.Gainsford, N.Bridger, O.Taylor; G.Wentzel, F.Gericke; D.Hopwood, H.Meyer, J.Bezuidenhout; P.Allen (capt.), P.Van Zyl; D.Putter, J.Wessels, D.Holton. 

 Belgrano A.C.:  M.Villamil; W.Guzmán, R.Mc.Crea Steele, A.Forrester, C.Lennon; R.Bazan, J.Forrester; B.Pearson, R.Churcholl Browne, D.Ghinson; V.Camardon, C.Hirsch, E.Verardo, G.Schon, P.Mc.Cormick. Junior Springboks: G.Wentzel; F.Roux, C.Holzhausen, N.Bridger, O.Taylor; D.Stewart, C.Smith; J.Nel, H.Meyer, W van Rensburg; F.De Jager, P.van Zyl; S.Kuhn, J.Wessels; C.Edwards. 

Provincia: J.Olazabal (OG); O.Bernacchi (CUR), L.Trotta (CP), J.Guidi (ADF), E.Bianchetti (ADF); A.Salinas (ORC), E.HoImgreen (capt. -ORC); J.Pulido (ADF), F.Varela (CASI); A.Moreno (ORC; B.Otaño (CP), A.Monticelli (CASI); R.Schmidt (CP); J.Casanegra(SIC), J.Lucas (OG).
Junior Springboks: C.Meyer; J.Engelbrecht, J.Wentzel.N.Bridger, O.Taylor; D.Stewart, F.Gericke; J.Nel, D.Hopwood, W.van Rensburg; P.Allen (capt.); P.van Zyl; S.Kuhn, J.Wessels, D.Putter. 

 Pueyrredón: H.De Carolis; C.Aguilar, E.Karplus, E.Le Poole, C.Giuliano; A.Guastella, C.Valentini; L.Sutton, L.Migelson, G.Morris; J.Trebotich, E.Shearer; S.Pini, R.de Marco, R.Seminario. Junior Springboks: J.Wentzel; R.Twigge J.Gainsford, C.Holtzhausen, F.Roux; D.Stewart, M.Smith; H.Meyer, D.Hopwood, J.Bezuidenhout; F.de Jager, P.Allen (capt.); D.Holton, C.Edwards, S.Kuhn. 

 Argentina: R.Raimundez (BCR); E.Bianchetti (ADF), E.Karplus (PUY), L.Mendez (O.Sanitarias), C.Giuliano (PUY); A.Guastella (PUY), E.Holmgreen (ORC); S.Hogg (BCR), M.Aspiroz (capt.)-(BCR); C.Álvarez (CUBA); E.Olivera (MDP), R.Hogg (BCR); E.Verardo (BAC), J.Casanegra (San Isidro Club), E.Gaviña (CUBA). Junior Springboks: H.Meyer; J.Engelbrecht, N.Bridger, G.Wentzel, O.Taylor; D.Stewart, F.Gericke; J.Nel, H.Meyer, W.van Rensburg; P.Allen (capt.); P.van Zyl; S.Kuhn, J.Wessels, D.Holton. 

Unión de Rugby de Rosario: F.Cavallo; R.Mauro, J.Pellejero, A.Robson, J.Arce; G.Recagno (capt.), R.Conti; L.Barbagelata; R.Cerfoglio, R.Ponce; D.Arroyo, M.Pavan; J.Madariaga, A.Alderete, R.Alonso. Junior Springboks: C.Meyer; J.Engelbrecht, F.Roux, C.Holtzhausen, R.Twigge; G.Wentzel, M.Smith; H.Meyer; J.Bezuidenhout, P.Allen (capt.); F.De Jager, J.Nel; D.Putter, C.Edwards, D.Holton. 

 Capital: R.Raimundez (BCR); C.Raimundez (BCR), E.Karplus (PUY), L.Mendez (OS), C.Giuliano (PUY); A.Guastella (PUY), V.Mayol (C.U.B.A.); S.Hogg (BCR); M, Aspiróz (capt.- BCR), C.Álvarez (C.U.B.A.); R.Hogg (BCR), J.Trebotich (PUY); E.Gaviña (CUBA), H.Vidou (BCR), E.Verardo (BAC). Junior Springboks: C.Wentzel; J.Engelbrecht, J.Gainsford, W.Bridger, R.Twigge; D.Stewart, F.Gericke; J.Nel, W.van Rensburg, J.Bezuidenhout; P.Allen (capt.); J.van Zyl; D.Putter, J.Wessels, S.Kuhn. 

Asociación Deportiva Francesa: J.Ríos; J.Tallarico, A.Quindimil, J.Guidi, O.Bernacchi; J.Dell'Acquila, E.González del Solar; J.Pulido, E.Michelstein, W.González O'Donnell; R.Khoury, G.Palou; R.Leyendo, B.Martínez, O.Cerbello.Junior Springboks: C.Meyer; O.Taylor, J.Gainsford, C.Holtzhausen, F.Roux; D.Stewart, M.Smith; W.van Rensburg, H.Meyer, J.Bezuidenhout; P.van Zyl, P.Allen (capt.), D.Putte, J.Wessels, D.Holton.

Argentina: R.Raimundez (BCR); E.Bianchetti (ADF), E.Karplus (PUY), J.Guidi (ADF), C.Giuliano (PUY); A.Guastella (PUY); E.Holmgreen (ORC); R.Hogg (BCR), C.Álvarez (CUBA), M.Aspiroz (capt. - BCR), S.Hogg (BCR); C.Olivera (MDP); E.Verardo (bac), J.Casanegra (sic), E.Gaviña (CUBA).
Junior Springboks: G.Wentzel; J.Engelbrecht, J.Gainsford, N.Bridger, R.Twigge; D.Stewart, F.Gericke; J.Nel, D.Hopwood, J.Bezuidenhout; P.Allen (capt.), P.van Zyl; S.Kuhn, J.Wessels, D.Putter.

Seven-a-side tournament 
Like other occasions, a "seven-a-side" tournament was arranged. Two South African team ("A" and "B") were arranged. They came easily in the final, with the "B" team victory.

Below are the results of South African teams.

Final match 

At the end of the tour, a match with mixed team were arranged. The exhibition match was played before the final of Argentinian championship (directed by South African referee Ackermann).

Rojos G. Wentzel,  F. Roux,  A. Forrester (Belgrano),  J. Gainsford,  M. Daireaux (SIC),  G. Gibelli (Club Newman),  C. Smith,  J. Saravia (C.U.B.A.), H. Meyer, J. Vibart (Old Philomathian),  P. Allen,  R. Logan (Pueyrredón),  D. Holton,  H. Lambruschini (ORC),  D. Putter Blancos: R. Devoto (SIC), H. Houssay (ORC),  C.Holtzhausen, J. Campos (San Fernando), O. Taylor,  D. Stewart, J. Forrester (BAC),  R. Pla Cárdenas (SIC),  D. Hopwood, H. Fernie (Old Philomathian), C. Hirsch(BAC), P. Van Zyl, S. Kuhn, S. Alonso (Gimnasia y Esgrima), C. Edwards.

References 

South Africa
Junior Springboks
Rugby union tours of Argentina
Junior Springboks
South Africa national rugby union team tours